"A Study in Pink" is the first episode of the television series Sherlock and first broadcast on BBC One and BBC HD on 25 July 2010. It introduces the main characters and resolves a murder mystery. It is loosely based upon the first Sherlock Holmes novel, A Study in Scarlet.

The episode was written by Steven Moffat, who co-created the series. It was originally filmed as a 60-minute pilot for Sherlock, directed by Coky Giedroyc. However, the BBC decided not to transmit the pilot, but instead commissioned a series of three 90-minute episodes. The story was refilmed, this time directed by Paul McGuigan. The British Board of Film Classification has rated the pilot as a 12 certificate (not suitable for children under 12) for video and online exhibition, and it is included as an additional feature on the DVD released on 30 August 2010.

Plot

John Watson, an army doctor injured in Afghanistan, meets Sherlock Holmes, who is looking for a flatmate to share a flat at 221B Baker Street, owned by landlady Mrs. Hudson. The police, led by Detective Inspector Lestrade, have been baffled by a series of deaths, described as "serial suicides". Holmes looks at the latest crime scene: the body of Jennifer Wilson, who was dressed in pink. She managed to claw the word "Rache" into the floor, and Sherlock reckons the victim died before completing the name "Rachel", the name of her deceased daughter. Holmes deduces she is from out of town and therefore had a suitcase. The police have not found a carry-on with the body, but Holmes discovers it abandoned nearby. Meanwhile, after a phone call, Watson is compelled to meet a man who claims to be Holmes's "arch-enemy". The man offers him money to spy on Holmes, but Watson refuses. He also tells Watson that he misses the war, not suffering from post-traumatic stress disorder as his therapist believes.

When Watson returns to Baker Street, Holmes asks him to text Wilson's still-missing phone, hoping the murderer will make a move. While waiting at a local restaurant, Holmes notices a taxi and they  outpace it on foot with shortcuts. However, the passenger is innocent. Holmes presumes "Rachel" was Wilson's e-mail password, and the victim planted her phone on the killer so GPS could trace him. At the same time, Watson finds the signal is coming from 221B Baker Street; Mrs. Hudson tells Holmes a taxi is waiting for him. Outside, the cabbie confesses to the murders but proclaims he merely speaks to his victims, and they kill themselves. The cabbie challenges Holmes to solve his puzzle. Later, he pulls out two bottles containing an identical pill: one is harmless, the other is poison. Afterward, he invites the victims to choose one, promising he will swallow the other — and he threatens to shoot them if they refuse.

Sherlock soon deduces the driver is an estranged father who was told three years earlier he was dying. The driver admits that he has a "sponsor" for his work, paying money for each murder for the driver's children. Holmes, having already noticed that the 'gun' is a novelty cigarette lighter, attempts to leave. However, the driver rechallenges him to choose a pill and see if he can solve the puzzle. Meanwhile, Watson has traced the GPS signal from the phone and followed the two men. He shoots the driver through a window in the adjacent building. Holmes tortures the cabbie to force him to say whether the pill taken was correct and who the sponsor is. He eventually reveals the name "Moriarty". The police arrive, and Holmes deduces the shooter is Watson but hides the truth from the police. Holmes and Watson leave the scene and run into the enigmatic man who claims to be Sherlock's arch-enemy earlier. He turns out to be Sherlock's elder brother, Mycroft, who works for the British government. Watson finally understands that Mycroft tried to bribe him out of genuine concern for Sherlock. Mycroft instructs his secretary to increase their surveillance status.

Allusions
The episode is loosely based on A Study in Scarlet and contains allusions to other works by Arthur Conan Doyle. Moffat said of "A Study in Pink" and A Study in Scarlet: "there are many elements of the story, and the broad shape of it, but we mess around with it a lot". Tom Sutcliffe of The Independent points out, "Fans will recognise at once that the close-reading Sherlock applies to John's mobile phone is drawn from an almost identical analysis of a pocket watch [taken from The Sign of the Four]. More slyly oblique is the conversion of the lost ring that Holmes uses to lure the killer in A Study in Scarlet into a lost 'ring', a mobile phone that can be used to contact the killer directly." The episode also uses an identical clue to the original story, but gives it a different meaning: both stories feature "Rache" written at the scene of the crime. In the original story, Holmes dismisses a suggestion that the victim was trying to write "Rachel", instead pointing out that "Rache" is German for "revenge". In this version Holmes's interpretation is reversed: he scoffs at the "revenge" explanation and suggests the victim was trying to write "Rachel".

The "three-patch problem" that Holmes describes is similar to the term "three-pipe problem" he uses in "The Red-Headed League".

The mention by Mrs. Hudson of "Mrs. Turner who lives next door" is a reference to a point in "A Scandal in Bohemia", where Holmes' landlady is once named as Mrs. Turner, instead of as Mrs. Hudson.

The feverish shout of "The game, Mrs. Hudson, is on!" is a reference to a line in "The Adventure of the Abbey Grange", "The game is afoot", which is frequently accredited to Holmes in adaptations. In the 2013 mini-episode "Many Happy Returns", a newspaper headline tantalisingly reads "The game is back on" as a harbinger of the character's imminent return.

The cabbie is dying of a brain aneurysm, while the murderer in A Study in Scarlet is dying of an aortic aneurysm.

Watson's reference in the final scene to having been shot in the shoulder but developing a psychosomatic limp in the leg is an allusion to a continuity error in the Conan Doyle stories: in the original A Study in Scarlet Watson's injury is said to be in his shoulder, but in Conan Doyle's later Holmes stories, it is said to be in his leg.

The second murder victim's name is James Phillimore, a reference to a case Holmes failed to solve in "The Problem of Thor Bridge".

The text messages Holmes sends Watson are taken nearly word for word from a telegram Holmes sends Watson in "The Adventure of the Creeping Man".

The case Holmes is working on when he meets Watson involves a guilty brother with a green ladder. This is an apparent reference to an unfinished story found after Conan Doyle's death since completed as "The Adventure of the Tall Man" and included (sometimes as only the original outline) in some editions of the Sherlock Holmes Apocrypha.

Production
The story was originally filmed as a 60-minute pilot for Sherlock, directed by Coky Giedroyc. It was planned to be broadcast in mid- to late 2009. The intention was to produce a full series should the pilot prove to be successful. However, the first version of the pilot – reported to have cost £800,000 – led to rumours within the BBC and wider media that Sherlock was a potential disaster. The BBC decided not to transmit the pilot, requesting a reshoot and a total of three 90-minute episodes. The newly shot episode, says journalist Mark Lawson, was "substantially expanded and rewritten, and completely reimagined in look, pace and sound". The first series of Sherlock was produced in reverse order; "A Study in Pink" was the last of the three to be produced. This was because episode writer and co-creator Steven Moffat was busy with the fifth series of Doctor Who. Background information on Sherlock and Mycroft's relationship was cut out of the final episode as it was viewed as giving too much away. For the pilot, the roles of Sally Donovan and Angelo were portrayed by Zawe Ashton and Joseph Long respectively but were portrayed by Vinette Robinson and Stanley Townsend in the hour-and-a-half episode.

The episode was set in 2010 rather than the Victorian period and so used modern devices such as mobile phones, TX1 London cabs and nicotine patches rather than the traditional pipe and other period props. The change from a pipe to a nicotine patch reflected changing social attitudes and broadcasting regulations. Director Paul McGuigan says that using modern technology is in keeping with Conan Doyle's character, pointing out that "In the books he would use any device possible and he was always in the lab doing experiments. It's just a modern-day version of it. He will use the tools that are available to him today in order to find things out". Sherlock Holmes still lives at the same Baker Street address as in Conan Doyle's stories. However, it was filmed at 185 North Gower Street. Baker Street was impractical because of the number of things labeled "Sherlock Holmes", which would need to be disguised.

Filming on the pilot began in January 2009 on location in London and Cardiff. It was written by Moffat and directed by Coky Giedroyc. A seven-hour night shoot took place on 20/21 January at the No Sign bar in Wind Street, Swansea. The bar had been redesigned as an Italian restaurant for the shoot, where Holmes and Watson dined. Location managers selected the bar as the venue because they needed a building that could double as an Italian restaurant that was close to an alley. On 21 January, scenes were shot in Newport Road, Cardiff. Location shooting concluded on 23 January with scenes filmed on Baker Street, London. During that week, filming was also done on location in Merthyr Tydfil.

According to Moffat and Gatiss, the BBC liked the pilot so much that they ordered three 90-minute films. However, the pilot version of "A Study in Pink" had been produced as a 60-minute film. The producers felt that they could not simply add another half an hour to the episode—they had to film it again. Producer Sue Vertue adds that additional footage to increase the length would not have matched because a different director of photography and a superior camera were used when filming the series.

Broadcast
"A Study in Pink" was first broadcast on BBC One on 25 July 2010. Overnight viewing figures showed that the episode was watched by a total of 7.5 million viewers on BBC One and BBC HD. Final viewing figures were up to 9.23 million viewers and averaged a 28.5% share of the UK audience with a high AI rating of 87. The episode was downloaded 1.403 million times on BBC's online iPlayer, the third most-requested programme of 2010.

Reception
The episode won a Peabody Award in 2010 "for bringing the beloved Victorian sleuth into the high-tech present while remaining faithful to his creator's original conception." It received critical acclaim. The Guardian'''s Dan Martin said, "It's early days, but the first of three 90-minute movies, "A Study in Pink", is brilliantly promising. It has the finesse of Spooks but is indisputably Sherlock Holmes. The deduction sequences are ingenious, and the plot is classic Moffat intricacy. Purists will take umbrage, as purists always do." However, Sam Wollaston, also for The Guardian, was concerned that some elements of the story were unexplained. Tom Sutcliffe for The Independent also suggests that Holmes was "a bit slow" to connect the attributes of the killer to a London taxicab driver, but his review is otherwise positive. He wrote, "Sherlock is a triumph, witty and knowing, without ever undercutting the flair and dazzle of the original. It understands that Holmes isn't really about plot but about charisma ... Flagrantly unfaithful to the original in some respects, Sherlock is wonderfully loyal to it in every way that matters". IGN's Chris Tilly rated the episode 7.8 out of 10, describing it as "an excellent 90-minute origin story wrapped in a rather uninspired mystery that fails to fully take flight". He was positive towards the introduction of the two lead characters and actors, but felt the mystery was "something of an anticlimax" and Inspector Lestrade was "the only weak link". Serena Davies of The Daily Telegraph particularly praised Cumberbatch and stated that the show "worked because it was having fun" and was "hugely enjoyable". Her only criticism was that Holmes was "too legible" and lacked the mystery previously seen in other portrayals of the character. The A.V. Club'' reviewer John Teti gave "A Study in Pink" a grade of a B, feeling that the modern-day upgrades were too forced and that the resolution was "overwrought". However, he praised the show for being "bold" and Freeman for being "eminently watchable", though the more youthful take on Holmes "[infected] the performances at times". Den of Geek selected "A Study in Pink" as one of the best TV episodes of 2010, describing it as "a masterclass in how to write an opening episode".

References

External links

 
 Newsarama: Annotations on "A Study in Pink" - Listing the connections between the episode and the original Holmes stories, compiled by comic book historian Alan Kistler.

2010 British television episodes
Television episodes written by Steven Moffat
Peabody Award-winning broadcasts
Television episodes about post-traumatic stress disorder
Sherlock (TV series) episodes